Schools in Norway are usually divided into the following categories: elementary schools (barneskole) 1st to 7th grade, lower secondary schools (ungdomsskole) 8th to 10th grade, upper secondary schools (videregående skole) 11th to 13th grade, colleges (høgskole) and universities (universitet). The common name for schools with grades 1 through 10 is grunnskole.

This is an incomplete list of schools in Norway:

Upper secondary schools

Akershus
Asker School of Arts, Asker
Asker videregående skole, Asker
Bjertnes videregående skole, Nittedal
Bjørkelangen videregående skole, Aurskog-Høland
Bleiker videregående skole, Asker
Drømtorp videregående skole, Ski
Dønski videregående skole, Bærum
Eidsvoll videregående skole, Eidsvoll
Eikeli videregående skole, Bærum
Holmen videregående skole, Asker
Hvam videregående skole, Nes
Jessheim videregående skole, Ullensaker
Kjelle videregående skole, Aurskog-Høland
Kongsskogen videregående skole, Asker
Lillestrøm videregående skole, Skedsmo
Lørenskog videregående skole, Lørenskog
Nadderud videregående skole, Bærum
Nannestad videregående skole, Nannestad
Nes videregående skole, Nes
Nesbru videregående skole, Asker
Nesodden videregående skole, Nesodden
Oppegård videregående skole, Oppegård
Rosenvilde videregående skole, Bærum
Rud videregående skole, Bærum
Rælingen videregående skole, Rælingen
Sandvika videregående skole, Bærum
Skedsmo videregående skole, Skedsmo
Ski videregående skole, Ski
Stabekk videregående skole, Bærum
Steinerskolen i Bærum, Bærum
Steinerskolen på Nesodden, Nesodden
Strømmen videregående skole, Skedsmo
Sørumsand videregående skole, Sørum
Valler videregående skole, Bærum
Vestby videregående skole, Vestby
Ås videregående skole, Ås

Aust-Agder
Arendal videregående skole, Arendal
Blakstad videregående skole, Froland
Dahlske videregående skole, Grimstad
Drottningborg videregående skole, Grimstad
Frivoll videregående skole, Grimstad
Holt videregående skole, Tvedestrand
Hornnes videregående skole, Evje og Hornnes
Hovden videregående skole, Bykle
Kristen videregående skole Sør, Bygland
Møglestu videregående skole, Lillesand
Academy of Commerce - Arendal, Arendal
Risør videregående skole, Risør
Strømsbu videregående skole, Arendal
Tvedestrand videregående skole, Tvedestrand
Valle videregående skole, Valle
Åmli videregående skole, Åmli

Buskerud
Academy of Commerce - Drammen, Drammen
Buskerud videregående skole, Modum
Drammen videregående skole, Drammen
Dyrmyr videregående skole, Kongsberg
Eiker videregående skole, Øvre Eiker
Gol videregående skole, Gol
Hurum videregående Steinerskole, Hurum
Hønefoss videregående skole, Ringerike
Kongsberg videregående skole, Kongsberg
Lier videregående skole, Lier
NTG - Geilo, Hol
Numedal videregående skole, Nore og Uvdal
Ringerike videregående skole, Ringerike
Rosthaug videregående skole, Modum
Røyken videregående skole, Røyken
Sonans Videregående, Drammen
St. Hallvard videregående skole, Lier
Strømsø videregående skole, Drammen
Tinius Olsens Skole, Kongsberg
Tyrifjord videregående skole, Hole
Ål videregående skole, Ål
Åssiden videregående skole, Drammen

Finnmark
Alta videregående skole, Alta
Deanu joatkkaskuvla/Tana videregående skole, Deatnu - Tana
Hammerfest videregående skole, Hammerfest
Nordkapp Maritime Høgskole og videregående skole, Nordkapp
Kirkenes videregående skole, Sør-Varanger
Lakselv videregående skole, Porsanger
Sámi joatkkaskuvla/Samisk videregående skole, Karasjok
Sami joatkkaskuvla ja boazodoalloskuvla/Samisk VGS og reindriftskole, Kautokeino
Vadsø videregående skole, Vadsø
Vardø videregående skole, Vardø

Hedmark
Academy of Commerce - Hamar, Hamar
Ankerskogen videregående skole, Hamar
Elverum videregående skole, Elverum
Grue videregående skole, Grue
Hamar katedralskole, Hamar
Jønsberg Upper Secondary School, Stange
Koppang videregående skole, Stor-Elvdal
Nord-Østerdal videregående skole, Tynset
Nordstumoen videregående skole, Stor-Elvdal
NTG - Kongsvinger, Kongsvinger
Ringsaker videregående skole, Ringsaker
Sentrum videregående skole, Kongsvinger
Skarnes videregående skole, Sør-Odal
Solør videregående skole, Åsnes
Stange videregående skole, Stange
Steinerskolen på Hedmarken, Stange
Storhamar videregående skole, Hamar
Storsteigen videregående skole, Alvdal
Trysil videregående skole, Trysil
Våler videregående skole, Våler
Øvrebyen videregående skole, Kongsvinger
Åsnes videregående skole, Åsnes

Hordaland
Academy of Commerce - Bergen, Bergen
Arna Gymnas, Bergen
Askøy videregående skole, Askøy
Austrheim videregående skole, Austrheim
Bergen High School of Commerce, Bergen
Bergen katedralskole, Bergen
Bergen maritime videregående skole, Bergen
Bjørgvin videregående skole, Bergen
Bjørkåsen videregående skole, Bergen
Bømlo videregående skole, Bømlo
Danielsen Intensivgymnas, Bergen
Danielsen videregående skole, Bergen
Etne videregående skole, Etne
Fana Gymnas, Bergen
Austevoll Fishing School, Austevoll
Fitjar videregående skole, Fitjar
Framnes kristne videregående skole, Kvam
Fusa videregående skole, Fusa
Fyllingsdalen videregående skole, Bergen
Garnes videregående skole, Bergen
Hjeltnes Gardener School, Ulvik
Hop videregående skole, Ask
Intensivgymnaset, Bergen
Knarvik videregående skole, Lindås
Kongshaug Upper Secondary School of Music, Os
Kvinnherad videregående skole, Kvinnherad
Kyrre skole, Bergen
Laksevåg videregående skole, Bergen
Langhaugen videregående skole, Bergen
Lønborg videregående skole, Bergen
Nettgymnas.no, Voss
Nordahl Grieg videregående skole, Bergen
Norheimsund videregående skole, Kvam
Odda videregående skole, Odda
Os Gymnas, Os
Os videregående skole, Os
Osterøy videregående skole, Osterøy
Rogne videregående skole, Voss
Rubbestadnes yrkesskole, Bømlo
Rudolf Steinerskolen i Bergen, Bergen
Sandsli videregående skole, Bergen
Slåtthaug videregående skole, Bergen
Sonans Videregående, Bergen
Sotra videregående skole, Fjell
Steinerskolen i Bergen, Bergen
Stend School of Agriculture, Bergen
Stord videregående skole, Stord
Tanks videregående skole, Bergen
U. Pihl videregående skole, Bergen
Voss Gymnas, Voss
Voss School of Agriculture, Voss
Voss School of Domestic Work, Voss
Øystese Gymnas, Kvam
Årstad videregående skole, Bergen
Åsane Gymnas, Bergen
Åsane videregående skole, Bergen

Møre og Romsdal
Atlanten videregående skole, Kristiansund
Aukra videregående skole, Aukra
Bjørknes Private School, Ålesund
Borgund videregående skole, Ålesund
Fagerlia videregående skole, Ålesund
Fannefjord videregående skole, Molde
Fræna videregående skole, Fræna
Gjermundnes videregående skole, Vestnes
Haram videregående skole, Haram
Herøy videregående skole, Herøy
Kristiansund videregående skole, Kristiansund
Molde School of Culture, Molde
Molde videregående skole, Molde
Nørve videregående skole, Ålesund
Rauma videregående skole, Rauma
Romsdal videregående skole, Molde
Spjelkavik videregående skole, Ålesund
Stranda videregående skole, Stranda
Sunndal videregående skole, Sunndal
Surnadal videregående skole, Surnadal
Sykkylven videregående skole, Sykkylven
Tingvoll videregående skole, Tingvoll
Ulstein videregående skole, Ulstein
Vestborg Vidaregående Skole, Stranda
Volda videregående skole, Volda
Ørskog videregående skole, Ørskog
Ørsta videregående skole, Ørsta
Ålesund maritime skole, Ålesund
Ålesund videregående skole, Ålesund

Nordland
Academy of Commerce - Bodø, Bodø
Academy of Commerce - Sortland, Sortland
Alstahaug videregående skole, Alstahaug
Andøy videregående skole, Andøy
Bodin videregående skole, Bodø
Bodø videregående skole, Bodø
Brønnøysund videregående skole, Brønnøy
Fauske videregående skole, Fauske
Frydenlund videregående skole, Narvik
Hadsel tekniske fagskole, Hadsel
Kabelvåg videregående skole, Vågan
Kleiva videregående skole, Sortland
Knut Hamsun videregående skole, Hamarøy
Kongsvegen videregående skole, Rana
Kristen videregående skole - Nordland, Nesna
Lødingen videregående skole, Lødingen
Melbu videregående skole, Hadsel
Meløy videregående skole, Meløy/Gildeskål
Mjølan videregående skole, Rana
Moheia videregående skole, Rana
Mosjøen videregående skole, Vefsn
Nordland School of Fishing - Lofoten tekniske fagskole, Vestvågøy
Oscarsborg videregående skole, Narvik
Saltdal videregående skole, Saltdal
Sandnessjøen videregående skole, Alstahaug
Solhaugen videregående skole, Narvik
Sortland videregående skole, Sortland
Stokmarknes videregående skole, Hadsel
Svolvær videregående skole, Vågan
Vefsn School of Agriculture, Vefsn
Vefsn videregående skole, Vefsn
Vestvågøy videregående skole, Vestvågøy

Nord-Trøndelag
Aglo videregående skole, Stjørdal
Grong videregående skole, Grong
Inderøy videregående skole, Inderøy
Leksvik videregående skole, Leksvik
Levanger videregående skole, Levanger
Meråker videregående skole, Meråker
Mære School of Agriculture, Steinkjer
Olav Duun videregående skole, Namsos/Overhalla
Ole Vig videregående skole, Stjørdal
Staup Gardener School, Levanger
Steinkjer tekniske fagskole, Steinkjer
Steinkjer videregående skole, Steinkjer
Stjørdal tekniske fagskole, Stjørdal
Val videregående skole, Nærøy
Verdal videregående skole, Verdal
Ytre Namdal videregående skole, Vikna

Oppland
Brandbu videregående skole, Gran
Dokka videregående skole, Nordre Land
Gausdal videregående skole, Gausdal
Gjøvik tekniske fagskole, Gjøvik
Gjøvik videregående skole, Gjøvik
Gran videregående skole, Gran
Lena videregående skole, Østre Toten
Lillehammer videregående skole, Lillehammer
MFSG - Gjøvik School of Marketing, Gjøvik
Mesna videregående skole, Lillehammer
Nord-Gudbrandsdal videregående skole, Sel
NTG - Lillehammer, Lillehammer
Raufoss videregående skole, Vestre Toten
Roa videregående skole, Lunner
Sonans Lillehammer, Lillehammer
Valdres vidaregåande skule, Nord-Aurdal
Valle videregående skole, Østre Toten
Vargstad videregående skole, Lillehammer
Vinstra videregående skole, Nord-Fron

Oslo
Academy of Commerce
Academy of Commerce - Oslo - Helsfyr
Berg videregående skole
Bjerke Videregående Skole
Bjørknes Privatskole
Blindern videregående skole
Bredtvet videregående skole
Eikelund videregående skole
Elvebakken videregående skole
Etterstad videregående skole
Fagerborg videregående skole
Forsøksgymnaset i Oslo
Foss videregående skole
Grefsen videregående skole
Hartvig Nissens skole
Hellerud videregående skole
Heltberg private gymnas
Holtet videregående skole
Kirkeveien videregående skole
Kongsskogen videregående skole
kuben videregående skole
Kristelig Gymnasium
Lambertseter videregående skole
Manglerud videregående skole
Natur videregående skole
Nordstrand videregående skole
Nordvoll videregående skole
Oslo by Steinerskole
Oslo High School of Trade
Oslo katedralskole
Oslo sanitetsforenings Hjelpepleierskole
Oslo Voksenopplæring
Persbråten videregående skole
Rudolf Steinerskolen i Oslo
Sandaker videregående skole
Sofienberg tekniske fagskole
Sogn videregående skole
Sonans Oslo
Stovner Videregående
Treider College
Treider Private School
Ullern videregående skole
Ulsrud videregående skole
Vinterlandbruksskolen i Oslo
Wang videregående skole

Østfold
Academy of Commerce - Østfold, Fredrikstad
Askim videregående skole, Askim
Borg videregående skole, Sarpsborg
Frederik II videregående skole, Fredrikstad
Glemmen videregående skole, Fredrikstad
Greåker videregående skole, Sarpsborg
Halden videregående skole, Halden
Kalnes videregående skole, Sarpsborg
Kvernhuset ungdoms skole, Fredrikstad
Kirkeparken videregående skole, Moss
Malakoff videregående skole, Moss
Mysen videregående skole, Eidsberg
Plus-skolen, Fredrikstad
Rudolf Steinerskolen i Moss, Moss
Seiersborg videregående skole, Fredrikstad
St. Olav videregående skole, Sarpsborg
Tomb School of Agriculture, Råde
Østfold møbelsnekkerskole, Eidsberg
Østfold tekniske fagskole, Sarpsborg

Rogaland
Academy of Commerce - Haugesund, Haugesund
Academy of Commerce - Stavanger, Stavanger
Bergeland videregående skole, Stavanger
Bryne videregående skole, Time
Dalane videregående skole, Eigersund
Forus videregående skole, Sandnes
Gand videregående skole, Sandnes
Godalen videregående skole, Stavanger
Haugaland videregående skole, Haugesund
Hetland videregående skole, Stavanger
Hinna videregående skole, Stavanger
Holgersens videregående skole, Haugesund
Jåttå videregående skole, Stavanger
Karmsund videregående skole, Haugesund
Kongsgård videregående skole (Stavanger katedralskole), Stavanger
Kopervik videregående skole, Karmøy
Lundehaugen videregående skole, Sandnes
Næringsmiddelteknisk skole, Norconserv, Stavanger
Randaberg videregående skole, Randaberg
Rogaland kranskole, Gjesdal
Rogaland videregående sjøaspirantskole, Stavanger
Rygjabø videregående skole, Finnøy
Sandnes videregående skole, Sandnes
Sauda videregående skole, Sauda
Skeisvang videregående skole, Haugesund
Sola videregående skole, Sola
Sonans Stavanger, Stavanger
St. Olav videregående skole, Stavanger
St. Svithun videregående skole, Stavanger
Stavanger offshore tekniske skole, Stavanger
Steinerskolen i Haugesund, Haugesund
Steinerskolen i Stavanger, Stavanger
Storasund videregående skole, Haugesund
Strand videregående skole, Strand
Time videregående skole, Time
Tryggheim videregående skole, Hå
Tveit videregående skole, Tysvær
Uldals videregående skole, Stavanger
Vardafjell videregående skole, Haugesund
Vinterlandbruksskulen i Ryfylke, Tysvær
Vinterlandbruksskulen på Jæren, Hå
Våland videregående skole, Stavanger
Øksnevad videregående skole, Klepp
Ølen videregående skole, Vindafjord
Lundeneset videregående skole, Vindafjord
Åkrehamn videregående skole, Karmøy

Sogn og Fjordane
Dale vidaregåande skule, Fjaler
Eid vidaregåande skule, Eid
Firda vidaregåande skule, Sandane, Gloppen
Flora vidaregåande skule, Flora
Førde tekniske fagskule, Førde
Hafstad vidaregåande skule, Førde
Høyanger vidaregåande skule, Høyanger
Luster vidaregåande skule, Luster
Mo og Jølster vidaregåande skule, Jølster
Måløy vidaregåande skule, Vågsøy
Sogn jord- og hagebruksskule, Aurland
Sogndal vidaregåande skule, Sogndal
Stryn vidaregåande skule, Stryn
Sygna vidaregåande skule, Balestrand
Vik vidaregåande skule, Vik
Øyrane vidaregåande skule, Førde
Årdal vidaregåande skule, Årdal

Sør-Trøndelag
Academy of Commerce - Trondheim, Trondheim
Adolf Øiens Skole, Trondheim
Brundalen videregående skole, Trondheim
Bybroen videregående skole, Trondheim
Byåsen videregående skole, Trondheim
Fosen videregående skole, Bjugn
Frøya videregående skole, Frøya
Gauldal videregående skole, Midtre Gauldal
Gerhard Schønings Skole, Trondheim
Granskogen Skole, Trondheim
Heimdal videregående skole, Trondheim
Hemne videregående skole, Hemne
Hitra videregående skole, Hitra
Kristen videregående skole - Trøndelag, Trondheim
Lade videregående skole, Trondheim
Ladejarlen videregående skole, Trondheim
Lukas Stiftelsens videregående skole, Malvik
Malvik videregående skole, Malvik
Meldal videregående skole, Meldal
Melhus videregående skole, Melhus
Oppdal videregående skole, Oppdal
Orkdal videregående skole, Orkdal
Ringve videregående skole, Trondheim
Rissa videregående skole, Rissa
Røros videregående skole, Røros
Selbu videregående skole, Selbu
Skjetlein videregående skole, Trondheim
Sonans Private High School, Trondheim
Sonans Trondheim, Trondheim
Steinerskolen i Trondheim, Trondheim
Steinerskolen på Rotvoll, Trondheim
Strinda videregående skole, Trondheim
Tiller videregående skole, Trondheim
Trondheim Katedralskole, Trondheim
Øya videregående skole, Melhus

Telemark
Bamble videregående skole, Bamble
Brekkeby videregående skole, Skien
Bø videregående skole, Bø
Croftholmen videregående skole, Bamble
Fyresdal videregående Steinerskole, Fyresdal
Klosterskogen videregående skole, Skien
Kragerø videregående skole, Kragerø
Kvitsund Gymnas, Kviteseid
Lunde videregående skole, Nome
Notodden videregående skole, Notodden
Academy of Commerce - Grenland, Skien
Osebakken videregående skole, Porsgrunn
Porsgrunn videregående skole, Porsgrunn
Rjukan Alpin videregående skole, Tinn
Rjukan videregående skole, Tinn
NTG - Skien, Skien
Skien videregående skole, Skien
Skogmo videregående skole, Skien
Sonans Porsgrunn, Porsgrunn
Søve videregående skole, Nome
Telemark tekniske fagskole, Porsgrunn
Treider College, Skien
Vest-Telemark videregående skole, Tokke

Troms
Academy of Commerce - Harstad, Harstad
Academy of Commerce - Tromsø, Tromsø
Bardufoss videregående skole, Målselv
Breivang videregående skole, Tromsø
Breivika videregående skole, Tromsø
Finnfjordbotn videregående skole, Lenvik
Harstad tekniske fagskole, Harstad
Heggen videregående skole, Harstad
Høgtun videregående skole, Målselv
Kongsbakken videregående skole, Tromsø
Kvaløya videregående skole, Tromsø
Nordborg videregående skole, Lenvik
Nordkjosbotn videregående skole, Balsfjord
Nordreisa videregående skole, Nordreisa
Norsk privatgymnas, Tromsø
Rå videregående skole, Kvæfjord
Senja videregående skole, Lenvik
Sjøvegan videregående skole, Salangen
Skjervøy videregående skole, Skjervøy
Skånland videregående skole, Skånland
Stangnes videregående skole, Harstad
Tromsdalen videregående skole, Tromsø
Tromsø kokk- og stuertskole, Tromsø
Tromsø maritime skole, Tromsø

Vest-Agder
Academy of Commerce - Kristiansand, Kristiansand
Byremo videregående skole, Audnedal
Eilert Sundt videregående skole, Farsund
Flekkefjord videregående skole, Flekkefjord
Gimle videregående skole, Kristiansand
Kristen videregående Sør, Lyngdal
Kristiansand katedralskole, Kristiansand
Kristiansand tekniske fagskole, Kristiansand
Kvadraturen videregående skole, Kristiansand
Kvinesdal videregående skole, Kvinesdal
Lista videregående skole, Farsund
Lyngdal videregående skole, Lyngdal
Mandal videregående skole, Mandal
Norsk fotterapeutskole A/S, Kristiansand
Sirdal videregående skole, Sirdal
Sonans Kristiansand, Kristiansand
Søgne videregående skole, Søgne
Sørlandets maritime videregående skole, Kristiansand
Tangen videregående skole, Kristiansand
Vennesla videregående skole, Vennesla
Vågsbygd videregående skole, Kristiansand
Øvrebø videregående skole, Vennesla

Vestfold
Academy of Commerce - Tønsberg, Tønsberg
Færder videregående skole, Tønsberg
Gjennestad Gardener School, Stokke
Greveskogen videregående skole, Tønsberg
Holmestrand videregående skole, Holmestrand
Horten videregående skole, Horten
Melsom videregående skole, Stokke
NettGymnaset, Tønsberg
Nøtterøy videregående skole, Nøtterøy
Re videregående skole, Re
Rudolf Steinerskolen i Vestfold, Nøtterøy
Sande videregående skole, Sande
Sandefjord videregående skole, Sandefjord
Thor Heyerdahl videregående skole, Larvik

Colleges
University of Agder
Bergen National Academy of the Arts
Bergen University College
Bjørknes College
Bodø University College
Buskerud University College
Finnmark University College
Gjøvik University College
Griegakademiet
Harstad University College
Hedmark University College
Sør-Trøndelag University College
Lillehammer University College
Molde University College
Narvik University College
Nesna University College
NHH
Nord-Trøndelag University College
Norwegian Air Force Academy
Norwegian Academy of Music
Norwegian College of Fishery Science
Norwegian Lutheran School of Theology
Norwegian Military Academy
Norwegian Naval Academy
Norwegian Police University College
Norwegian School of Information Technology
Norwegian School of Management
Oslo National Academy of the Arts
Oslo School of Architecture and Design
Oslo and Akershus University College
Sámi University College
Sogn og Fjordane University College
Stavanger Katedralskole
Stord/Haugesund University College
Sør-Trøndelag University College
Telemark University College
Tromsø University College
Vestfold University College
Volda University College
Østfold University College
Ålesund University College

Universities

Norwegian University of Life Sciences (UMB) (Ås) (estb. 2005)
Norwegian University of Science and Technology (NTNU) (Trondheim) (estb. 1996)
University of Bergen (UiB) (Bergen) (estb. 1948)
University of Oslo (UiO) (Oslo) (the country's first university) (estb. 1811)
University of Stavanger (UiS) (Stavanger) (estb. 2005)
University of Tromsø (UiTø) (Tromsø) (the world's northernmost university) (estb. 1972)

Other Schools
Grimstad Bible School
Red Cross Nordic United World College, a United World College, established in 1995
Skagerak International School, established in 1991
Sagavoll Folkehøgskole
Stiftelsen Norges Toppidrettsgymnas, The Norwegian College of Elite Sport

References

External links
 Structure of Norwegian Educational System

Norway
Norway
Schools
Schools
Schools